Nulakamamidi is a village in Y. Ramavaram Mandal, East Godavari district in the state of Andhra Pradesh in India.

Demographics 
 India census, This Village had a population of 98, out of which 43 were male and 55 were female. Population of children below 6 years of age were 14%. The literacy rate of the village is 18%.

References 

Villages in Y. Ramavaram mandal